Jeff Rector (born September 12, 1958) is an American actor.  He has appeared in over 60 feature films and television programs. On 28 April 2012 he hosted the launch party of the Burbank International Film Festival. He has an identical twin brother, Jerry Rector, who is also an actor.

Early life and career
He was born in St. Louis and grew up in both Michigan and California.  He decided to pursue an acting career after working at Universal Studios as a tour guide. His first roles were in New York soap operas.

Movies

Bad President (2020) as Donald Trump
Fragments (2008) as Cop
Solar Flare as Trent
InAlienable (2008) as Professor Jeffries
Dark World (2008) as Monihan
Scarecrow Gone Wild (2004) as Ray
The Theory of Everything (2003) as Roger
Pray Another Day (2003) as Bond James
Fatal Kiss (2002, TV) as Richard Clarke
Firestorm Rising (2001) as Cage
Luna Butterflys (2000) as Bernie
Never Look Back (2000)
The Ramayan
Madam Savant (1997) as Sergeant Stevens
In My Sister's Shadow (1997, TV) as Man at bar
Rapid Assault (1997, TV) as David Phillips
Dinosaur Valley Girls (1996) as Tony Markham
The Killer Inside (1996) as Alex Johnson
Friend of the Family II (1996) as Mark
The Darkening (1995) as Scott Griffin
Galaxis (1995) as Tray
Obsession Kills (1995)
Tornado Run (1995) as Lieutenant Billy Gunn
Ballistic (1995) as Case

Legion of the Night (1995) as Francis Vansemié
Death Riders (1994) as Cop
Love Street 1: I Dreamed of Angels Crying (1994, TV)
Magic Kid II (1994) as Jerry
Marching Out of Time (1993) as Lieutenant Butch
The Secrets of Lake Success (1993, TV miniseries) as Cop #1
Hellmaster (1992) as Jesse Jameson
Street Soldiers (1991) as Priest
Pretty Woman (1990)
Danger Zone III: Steel Horse War (1990) as Wyman
Cocktail (1988) (scene cut)
Dr. Hackenstein (1988)
Wall Street (1987) as Trader
Fatal Obsession
Nightfall

TV roles
Black Scorpion as Evil Twin #2
SFN: Science Fiction News as Host
On Common Ground
Promised Land
All My Children
One Life to Live

TV guest appearances
American Horror Story ("Valerie Solanas Died for Your Sins: Scumbag", 2017) as Male Anchor
How I Met Your Mother ("Twelve Horny Women", 2012) as Cop
City Guys ("Jamal X", 2000) as Policeman #1
Arrest & Trial (2000)
Beverly Hills, 90210 ("Local Hero", 1999) as Officer Terry
NYPD Blue ("Twin Petes", 1998) as Peter Welch
The Keenan Ivory Wayans Show
Beverly Hills Bordello ("Use Your Imagination", 1996) as Felix
Sliders ("State of the A.R.T", 1996) as Scarface P.A.U.L.
The Watcher ("The Gift", 1995)
Compromising Situations ("The Elevator") as Emerson Sprague
Father Dowling Mysteries ("The Devil and the Deep Blue Sea Mystery", 1990) as Roland
Star Trek: The Next Generation ("Allegiance", 1990) as Alien 2
In Living Color

Theatre
Godspell as Jeffrey
Duck Hunting as Kusikov
Equus as Alan Strang
Bagels as President Regan
Taming of the Shrew as Lucentio
Passion of Dracula as Johnathan Harker
Jesus Christ Superstar as Peter
Kiss Me Kate as Harrison Howell
Brigadoon

Other works
1996 video game Fox Hunt as Alan
Video game Phantasmagoria
Video game X-Files Interactive Adventure as Agent Adam Burke
Video game The Journeyman Project 3: Legacy of Time as Gage Blackwood

Behind-the-scenes credits
Pray Another Day (2003) - writer, director
Fatal Kiss (2002, TV) - writer, director
SFN: Science Fiction News (TV series) - co-producer
Galaxis (1995) - stunts
Double Impact (1991) - photo double
The 23 Minute Comedy Hour - writer, director, producer
Gorilla TV - writer, director, producer

References

External links

Living people
Male actors from Michigan
American male film actors
American male television actors
1958 births